Qlone is a photogrammetry app for creation of 3D models on mobile devices. Qlone is unique in being able to create 3D models on the mobile device without recourse to external cloud servers. The resultant 3D models can be used for augmented reality, virtual reality, 3D printing, educational technology, product design, fine art, science, and manufacturing.

Qlone was featured at the Apple Worldwide Developers Conference in 2021. It was also featured on BBC Click in their episode on Artificial Intelligence and Augmented Reality.

Qlone features

3D scanning 
3D scanning with Qlone requires the use of an included mat design. The user prints the mat onto a sheet of paper, then places the object to be scanned in the centre of the mat. An augmented reality dome within the Qlone app guides the user through the subsequent scanning process. The iOS version of Qlone allows scanning without the mat.

3D editing 
Qlone's editing features allow users to adjust their 3D scanned models using texture mapping, polygon mesh size simplification, digital sculpting, cleaning and smoothing, and artistic effects.

File export 
Qlone exports directly to multiple 3D platforms including SketchFab, i.materialise, Lens Studio for SnapChat, Shapeways and CGTrader. Models can also be exported in a variety of 3D formats for use in other 3D tools – OBJ, STL, FBX, USDZ, GLB (Binary gLTF), PLY, and X3D.

Notable uses 

 Space rock scans for the European Space Agency
 Virtual exhibits for the Fort Vancouver National Historical Site
 Augmented reality menus for the Madrid restaurant chain 80 Degrees
 Creation of cadaver models for educational neurosurgical simulations
 MIT xPRO online courses in VR and AR technologies
 3D models for Museums and Archaeological artifacts
 3D models of faces and human bodies for Anatomy and Biology education

See also 

 Procreate
 Blender
 Unity
 Cinema4D
 SketchFab
 3DF Zephyr
 Metashape
 RealityCapture
 Comparison of photogrammetry software

References

External links 

 

3D scanners
3D graphics software
Android (operating system) software
Digital art
Graphics software
IOS software